Crescent Glacier may refer to:

Crescent Glacier (Antarctica)
Crescent Glacier (Alaska)
Crescent Glacier (Mount Adams), Washington